Bob Marley is an American comedian. He has appeared on The David Letterman Show, Late Night with Conan O'Brien, and Comedy Central. He can be seen in the film The Boondock Saints.

Personal life
Marley grew up in Bangor, Maine before moving to Portland, Maine. Marley said his "dad had no idea there was a singer named Bob Marley." He attended the University of Maine at Farmington, where he realized wanted to pursue comedy as his career.

Career
Marley's comedic bits are mostly about life in Maine. His first television appearance was on Comedy Central. He also appeared as Detective Greenly in the movie The Boondock Saints, and reprised this role in The Boondock Saints II: All Saints Day.
 
He been a guest host on XM Radio channels 97, Blue Collar Radio, and 99, RawDog Comedy; and, as of 2013, appears weekly on the Portland-based station Coast 93.1-WMGX in a segment called "The World According to Bob."

Personal achievements
On Thursday, September 23, 2010, at 11:02 pm EDT, Marley entered the Guinness Book of World Records with the longest continuous stand-up routine, beating the record held by Lindsay Webb from Australia. He completed 40 hours of comedy, the first 17 hours and 14 minutes without any repetition of material. Marley's record was broken by David Scott on April 30, 2013, with a time of 40 hours and 8 minutes.

Television
 Badly Dubbed Porn
 The Dink Show with Tyler Dama
 Spider Man: Return Of The Mongols
 Late Show with David Letterman
 Late Night with Conan O'Brien
 The Late Late Show with Craig Kilborn
 MAD TV
 Prime Time Live with Diane Sawyer
 NBC's Showcase
 Rodney Dangerfield's Comedy Cure on TBS
 Mars and Venus with Cybill Shepherd
 The Martin Short Show
 Comedy Central Presents
 Shorties Watchin' Shorties
 The Late Late Show
 Comics Unleashed
 Late Night with Jimmy Fallon

Filmography
 The Breaks (1999)
 The Boondock Saints (1999)
 Liar's Club (2001)
 The Boondock Saints II: All Saints Day (2009)

Discography
 3000 Shows Later (1997)
 All New Stuff (1998)
 Up Against the Brick Wall (1999)
 Sold Out! (2000)
 Live at Merrill Auditorium (2001)
 Comedian Bob Marley Live (previously released material) (2002)
 I'm Tellin' You (2002)
 Dude...Don't Be Such a Dink! (2003)
 Greatest Hits Vol.1 (DVD) (2003)
 Put the Boots to 'Er (2004)
 Greatest Hits Vol.2 (DVD) (2004)
 Upta Camp (2005)
 Greatest Hits Vol.3 (DVD) (2005)
 Naughty Pine aka Worldwide (CD/DVD combo) (2006)
 Don't Feed The Native (previously released material) (2006)
 Goin' Up the Faya (2007)
 Big Mouth Bob (CD/DVD combo) (2008)
 Runamuck (2008)
 Maine-iac on the Loose (2008)
 Drop It Haahd (CD/DVD combo) (2009)
 15 Years in Comedy (box set) (2009)
 Weirdo (2010)
 Minivan Owner (CD/DVD combo) (2010)
 New England's King Of Comedy (2011)
 Guinness World Champ (CD/DVD Combo) (2011)
 Irish Curse (2011)
 Wicked Funny with Greatest Hits Vol.4 (CD/DVD combo) (2012)
 Traveling Hooligan (2013)
 Mouth Farts (2014)
  Down One Nut (2015)

References

External links
 Bob Marley's official homepage
 

20th-century American comedians
21st-century American comedians
American male comedians
Comedians from Maine
Deering High School alumni
Living people
Male actors from Portland, Maine
People from Bangor, Maine
University of Maine at Farmington alumni
Year of birth missing (living people)